5-(2-Aminopropyl)-2,3-dihydrobenzofuran (5-APDB, 3-Desoxy-MDA, EMA-4) is a putative entactogen drug of the phenethylamine and amphetamine classes. It is an analogue of MDA where the heterocyclic 3-position oxygen from the 3,4-methylenedioxy ring has been replaced by a methylene bridge. 6-APDB is an analogue of 5-APDB where the 4-position oxygen has been replaced by a methylene bridge instead. 5-APDB was developed by a team led by David E. Nichols at Purdue University as part of their research into non-neurotoxic analogues of MDMA.

In animal studies, 5-APDB's effects generalize most closely to non-stimulant MDMA analogues such as MBDB and MMAI, while producing no substitution for LSD or amphetamine. In vitro studies show that 5-APDB acts as a highly selective serotonin releasing agent (SSRA), with IC50 values of 130 nM, 7,089 nM, and 3,238 nM for inhibiting the reuptake of serotonin, dopamine, and norepinephrine, respectively. In contrast, 6-APDB is more balanced on the three monoamine neurotransmitters and acts more similarly to MDA and MDMA. 

Methoxy-substituted analogues of 5-APDB and 6-APDB have also been made and substituted for DOM in animal tests, although they were around one tenth as potent as DOM.

Legal status

China
As of October 2015 5-APDB is a controlled substance in China.

UK
On June 10, 2013 5-APDB and a number of analogues were classified as Temporary Class Drugs in the UK following an ACMD recommendation. This means that sale and import of the named substances are criminal offences and are treated as for class B drugs.

References 

Designer drugs
5-Benzofuranethanamines
Substituted amphetamines
Serotonin releasing agents
Entactogens and empathogens